JWH-365 ((5-(2-Ethylphenyl)-1-pentyl-1H-pyrrol-3-yl)(naphthalen-1-yl)methanone) is a synthetic cannabinoid from the naphthoylpyrrole family which acts as an agonist of the CB1 (Ki = 17 ± 1nM) and CB2 (Ki = 3.4 ± 0.2nM) receptors, with a strong (~5x) selectivity for the CB2 receptor over the CB1 receptor. JWH-365 was first synthesized in 2006 by John W. Huffman and colleagues to examine the nature of ligand binding to the CB1 receptor.

Legality
In the United States JWH-365 is not federally scheduled, although some states have passed legislation banning the sale, possession, and manufacture of JWH-365.

In Canada, JWH-365 and other naphthoylpyrrole-based cannabinoids are Schedule II controlled substances under the Controlled Drugs and Substances Act.

In the United Kingdom, JWH-365 and other naphthoylpyrrole-based cannabinoids are considered Class B drugs under the Misuse of Drugs Act 1971.

See also
List of JWH cannabinoids
Synthetic cannabinoid

References 

JWH cannabinoids
CB1 receptor agonists
CB2 receptor agonists
Designer drugs
Naphthoylpyrroles